David John Ibbetson  is a British legal academic. He was Regius Professor of Civil Law at the University of Cambridge from 2000 to 2022, and President of Clare Hall from 2013 to 2020. From 2009 until 2012 he served as the chairman of the Faculty of Law, University of Cambridge. He was General Editor of the Cambridge Law Journal between 2003 and 2009.

Biography
David Ibbetson obtained his MA and PhD in Law at Corpus Christi College, Cambridge. In 1980, he became a Fellow and Tutor in Law at Magdalen College, Oxford. He returned to Corpus Christi in 2000, following his appointment as Regius Professor of Civil Law at the Faculty of Law in the University of Cambridge. He was elected to the British Academy in 2003. In 2004 he became Warden of Leckhampton House, the College's site for postgraduate students. In August 2013 Ibbetson left Corpus Christi College when he became the eighth President of Clare Hall, Cambridge, succeeding Sir Martin Harris. He was succeeded by Alan Short as head of Clare Hall in August 2020.

Ibbetson is originally and primarily an English legal historian, but he is also expert in Roman law and has written comparative works relating to the history of European law. Whilst he has published on a wide range of subjects, his focus has been on the historical relationship between English Common Law and the legal systems and legal thought of the rest of Europe.

Bibliography 
Oxford International Encyclopedia of Legal History [editor] (2009)
Sir William Jones, Essay on the Law of Bailments [editor] (2007)
Common Law and Ius Commune (Selden Society) (2001)
A Historical Introduction to the Law of Obligations (1999)
The Roman Law Tradition [editor] (1994)

References

External links
 

Fellows of Corpus Christi College, Cambridge
Fellows of Magdalen College, Oxford
Fellows of the British Academy
Living people
Presidents of Clare Hall, Cambridge
Regius Professors of Civil Law (University of Cambridge)
Alumni of Corpus Christi College, Cambridge
Legal scholars of the University of Oxford
Place of birth missing (living people)
Year of birth missing (living people)
Legal historians
Scholars of Roman law